Colin Walker (born 1975) is a Scottish international lawn and Indoor bowler.

Bowls career
In 2013, he won three medals at the European Bowls Championships in Spain.

He won the National Pairs Championship in 2014 at the National Championships partnering Ronnie Duncan. During the 2016 World Indoor Bowls Championship pairs they were beaten finalists, losing out to fellow Scots Stewart Anderson and Darren Burnett. The pair also reached the semi finals during the 2019 World Indoor Bowls Championship.

Significant career wins include the 2018 Scottish Masters.

References

1975 births
Living people
Scottish male bowls players
Bowls European Champions